Egypt sent a delegation to compete at the 1976 Summer Paralympics in Toronto, Ontario, Canada. Its athletes rank twentieth in the overall medal count.  and  won gold medals.

See also 
 1976 Summer Paralympics
 Egypt at the 1976 Summer Olympics

References 

Nations at the 1976 Summer Paralympics
1976
Summer Paralympics